Maxence Rivera (born 30 May 2002) is a French professional footballer who plays as a midfielder for  club Le Puy, on loan from  club Saint-Étienne.

Club career
Rivera began playing football at the youth academy of Bourgoin-Jallieu, and joined the youth academy of Saint-Étienne in 2015. On 3 January 2020, he signed his first professional contract with Saint-Étienne. He made his professional debut with Saint-Étienne in a 6–1 Coupe de la Ligue loss to Paris Saint-Germain on 8 January 2020.

On 31 August 2022, Rivera signed for Championnat National club Le Puy on a season-long loan.

References

External links
 
 Saint-Étienne profile
 
 
 

2002 births
Living people
Sportspeople from Perpignan
Footballers from Occitania (administrative region)
French footballers
France youth international footballers
Association football midfielders
FC Bourgoin-Jallieu players
AS Saint-Étienne players
Le Puy Foot 43 Auvergne players
Ligue 1 players
Ligue 2 players

Championnat National 2 players
Championnat National 3 players